John Blackburne may refer to:
John Blackburne (botanist) (1694–1786), English industrialist and botanist
John Blackburne (1754–1833), Member of Parliament (MP) for Lancashire 1784–1830
John Blackburne (Huddersfield MP) (died 1837), Member of Parliament (MP) for Huddersfield 1834–1837
John Ireland Blackburne (1783–1874), MP for Newton (1807–1818) and for Warrington (1835–1847)
John Ireland Blackburne (1817–1893), son of the above, MP for  South West Lancashire 1875–1885

See also 
 John Blackburn (disambiguation)